Sjoert Brink (born 1981 in Zevenhuizen, Zuidplas) is a Dutch professional bridge player who plays for Switzerland. He is known for his successful partnership with Bas Drijver.

Bridge accomplishments

Wins

 Bermuda Bowl (2) 2011 2022
 North American Bridge Championships (3)
 Reisinger Board-a-Match Teams (1) 2018
 Spingold Knockout Teams (1) 2019
 Soloway Knockout Teams (1) 2019

Runners-up

 World Olympiad Teams Championship (1) 2004
 North American Bridge Championships (4)
 Jacoby Open Swiss Teams (1) 2011 
 Blue Ribbon Pairs (1) 2010 
 Reisinger (1) 2019 
 Vanderbilt (1) 2013

References

External links
 
 

1981 births
Living people
Dutch contract bridge players
Bermuda Bowl players
People from Zuidplas
Sportspeople from South Holland